This is a list of notable Malaysian sportspeople of Indian origin, including original immigrants who obtained Malaysian citizenship and their Malaysian descendants. Entries on this list are demonstrably notable by having a linked current article or reliable sources as footnotes against the name to verify they are notable and define themselves either full or partial Indian origin, whose ethnic origin lie in India.

This list also includes emigrant Malaysian sportspeople of Indian origin and could be taken as a list of famous Malaysian sportspeople of Indian origin.

Athletics
 Canagasabai Kunalan,  Singaporean sprinter, relay runner, former footballer and educator.
 Govindasamy Saravanan,  Malaysian race walker. He won the gold medal at the 1998 Commonwealth Games
 Mani Jegathesan, Malaysian athletes
 Nashatar Singh Sidhu, Malaysian former javelin thrower who competed in the 1964 Summer Olympics and in the 1968 Summer Olympics.
 Shanti Govindasamy

Aquatics
 Abdul Malik Mydin, Malaysian solo long-distance swimmer

Badminton

 Punch Gunalan
 Renuga Veeran,  Australian badminton player
 Sutheaswari Mudukasan
 Sannatasah Saniru, female Malaysian badminton player who competed at 2012 Japan Super Series
 Anita Raj Kaur

Cricket
 Arul Vivasvan Suppiah
 David Thalalla
 Jeevandran Nair
 John Prakash
 Krishnamurthi Muniandy
 Kunjiraman Ramadas
 Lall Singh
 Manrick Singh 
 Marimuthu Muniandy
 Neville Liyanage
 Pavandeep Singh
 Rakesh Madhavan
 Ramesh Menon
 Ramesh Menon
 Rattan Jaidka (1927)
 Rohan Mark Selvaratnam
 Rohan Vishnu Suppiah
 Santhara Vello
 Sarath Jayawardene (1993–2007)
 Shankar Retinam
 Suresh Navaratnam
 Suresh Sakadivan
 Suresh Singh
 Suriaprakash Ganesan (2004–present)
 Suhan Alagaratnam
 Sydney Maartensz

Fencing
 Ronnie Theseira

Association football or soccer
 Devasagayam Christie Jayaseelan
 Reuben Thayaparan Kathiripillai 
 Depan Sakwati
 K. Nanthakumar
 Razali Umar Kandasamy
 Gary Steven Robbat
 Kunanlan Subramaniam
 Suppiah Chanturu
 K. Sasi Kumar
 Rajesh Perumal
 V. Kavi Chelvan
 G. Puaneswaran
 S. Sivanesan
 Gopinathan Ramachandra
 D. Saarvindran
 Surendran Ravindran
 K. Ravindran
 Thirumurugan Veeran
 Gunasekaran Jeevananthan
 Padathan Gunalan
 M. Sivakumar
 R. Surendran
 G. Mahathevan
 Gurusamy 
 S. Subramaniam
 Veenod Subramaniam
1.Representing or had represented the Malaysia national football team
 R. Arumugam, Malaysia football legend
 Santokh Singh, Malaysia football legend
 R. Surendran, striker for Selangor FA
 Thanabalan Nadarajah, played in Malaysia national football team during the 2017 Southeast Asian Games
 K. Gurusamy
 S. Kunanlan
 Thirumurugan Veeran
 Victor Andrag
 D. Saarvindran
 S. Veenod, plays as a midfielder for Selangor FA 
 Gary Steven Robbat
 K. Ravindran
 K. Rajan
 R. Surendran
 K. Ravindran
 Suppiah Chanturu
 V. Murugan, former Malaysia national football team goalkeeper
 K. Nanthakumar
 S. Subramaniam
 D. Christie Jayaseelan
 K. Sasi Kumar
 Ramesh Lai Ban Huat
 Padathan Gunalan
 S. Sarath Babu
 G. Jeevananthan
 C. Premnath
 K. Reuben
 G. Mahathevan
 D. Surendran
 Surendran Ravindran
 V. Saravanan
 Thamil Arasu Ambumamee
 Gary Steven Robbat
 D. Saarvindran
 K. Depan Sakwati
 V. Kavi Chelvan
 Devasagayam Christie Jayaseelan
 P. Rajesh
 M. Sivakumar
 K. Linggam
 S. Sivanesan
 Yosri Derma Raju
 Gunasekaran Jeevananthan
 Syamer Kutty Abba
 G. Mahathevan
 G. Puaneswaran
 Gopinathan Ramachandra
C.Nadarajan
 V.Krishnasamy

Hockey
 Kuhan Shanmuganathan, Malaysia Number one hockey player. Kuhan is known as one of the penalty corner specialist.
 Kumar Subramaniam, national hockey player 
 Peter van Huizen, national hockey player
 Selvaraju Sandrakasi
 Sarjit Singh, national hockey player
 Baljit Singh Charun, national hockey player 
 Baljit Singh Sarjab, national player
 Duraisingam Sinnadurai, national hockey player
 John Shaw,  former field hockey player, who represented Great Britain in the 1992 Summer Olympics in Barcelona and the 1996 Summer Olympics in Atlanta

Martial art
 Puvaneswaran Ramasamy, National elite Karate, Rangga Roa tae kwon do l

Motorsport
 Karamjit Singh, first Asian driver to win the Fédération Internationale de l'Automobile (FIA) Production Car World Championship for Drivers
 Nadarajan Periasamy
 Nandakumar Puspanathan

Scrabble
 Ganesh Asirvatham, world runner-up scrabble player in 2007, and Guinness World Records holder since 2007.

Sports management
 Shebby Singh, Sport Pundit
 Peter Velappan, general secretary of the Asian Football Confederation from 1978 to 2007
 K. Rajagopal, Malaysia national football team manager
 B. Sathianathan, former coach of Malaysia national football team
 K. Devan, former manager of Malaysia national football team
 M. Karathu, former Malaysian football manager and player.
 E. Elavarasan, current coach of the Malaysia Super League football team Terengganu FA
 S. Veloo, ex-coach of Penang FA
 Stanley Bernard Stephen Samuel
 Sarjit Singh, national field hockey coach

Squash
 Nicol David, world number one female squash player
 Vanessa Raj
 Sanjay Singh
 Sivasangari Subramaniam

Tennis
 Theiviya Selvarajoo, Malaysia Fed Cup team player
 Kanagaraj Balakrishnan

Track cycling
 Arulraj Rosli
 Murugayan Kumaresan

References

Lists of Malaysian people
Lists of people of Indian descent
Malaysian people of Indian descent